This is a list of Italian television related events from 2006.

Events
6 January - The 2004 Miss Italia Cristina Chiabotto and her partner Raimondo Todaro win the second season of Ballando con le stelle.
27 April - Augusto De Megni wins the sixth season of Grande Fratello.

Debuts

RAI

Miniseries 

 Raccontami (Tell me the story) – by Riccardo Donna and Tiziana Aristarco, with Massimo Ghini and Lunetta Savino; 2 seasons. Italian version of the Spanish Cuéntame cómo pasó.

Serials 

 L’ispettore Coliandro (Inspector Coliandro) – by the Manetti bros, with Giampaolo Morelli; 7 seasons. The series has for protagonist Marco Coliandro (created by Carlo Lucarelli), a young police inspector in Bologna, seemingly a “tough guy” but actually naïve and bungling.

International
2 October - / Get Ed (Rai 2) (2005–2006)
// The Baskervilles (Boing) (2000)

Television shows

Rai

Drama 

 Bartali: The iron man, by Alberto Negrin, with Pierfrancesco Favino in the title role and Simone Gandolfo as Fausto Coppi; 2 episodes.

Variety 

 Ballando con le stelle (2005–present)

Mediaset
Grande Fratello (2000–present)

Ending this year

Births

Deaths

See also
List of Italian films of 2006

References